Halvan (also Romanized as Ḩalvān and Halūān) is a village in Pir Hajat Rural District, in the Central District of Tabas County, South Khorasan Province, Iran. At the 2006 census, its population was 569, in 204 families.

References 

Populated places in Tabas County